In Virginia, Brooklyn may refer to:

Brooklyn, Halifax County, Virginia
Brooklyn, Pulaski County, Virginia

See also
Brooklyn, West Virginia (disambiguation)